The Reichsgericht (Reich Court) was the supreme criminal and civil court in the German Reich from 1879 to 1945. It was based in Leipzig, Germany. The Supreme Court was established when the Reichsjustizgesetze (Imperial Justice Laws) came into effect and it built a widely regarded body of jurisprudence during the period of the German Empire and Weimar Republic.

During the rise of the Third Reich, the Reichsgericht became deeply embroiled in the National Socialist agenda. It even involved itself in matters of Nazi Matrimonial and Contract Law before enactment of the Nuremberg Laws. During and after the Nazi period it received criticism for the ease, and even willingness, with which it provided the highest level of formal legal justification for Nazi programs. Immediately after the end of World War II, the Reichsgericht was dissolved, and reformed into the German High Court for the Unified Economic Region (Trizone), the Allied occupation zones of France, the United Kingdom and the United States.

Building
Located in Leipzig, Saxony, Germany, the building was designed by Ludwig Hoffmann and Peter Dybwad, and construction was completed in 1895. It is designed in the Italian renaissance style and features two large courtyards, a central cupola and a large portico at the entrance. The rich decorative gable and sculptures are by Otto Lessing. After the reunification, the former Reichsgericht building was renovated and became the seat of the Bundesverwaltungsgericht (Federal Administrative Court).

List of presidents

References

Legal history of Germany
Germany
Buildings and structures in Leipzig
Defunct courts
1879 establishments in Germany
1945 disestablishments in Germany
Courts and tribunals established in 1879
Courts and tribunals disestablished in 1945